Perryville is a home rule-class city along the Chaplin River in western Boyle County, Kentucky, in the United States. The population was 751 at the time of the 2010 U.S. Census. It is part of the Danville Micropolitan Statistical Area.

History
The site was first settled by James Harbeson and a band of Virginians in the final stages of the American Revolution . Harbeson's Fort or Station was located near a cave and spring to provide additional protection from Indian raids. The settlement's position beside the river and along roads leading to Harrod's Fort, Louisville, Lebanon, and Danville caused it to be renamed Harbeson's Crossing.

In 1815, Edward Bullock and William Hall laid out a new town at the site named for Cmdr. Oliver Hazard Perry, the hero of the 1813 Battle of Lake Erie during the War of 1812. Bullock started the post office the next year and the state legislature incorporated the city in 1817.
 In the late 1830s, a line of buildings next to the Chaplin River formed the basis of the village of Perryville. Now called "Merchants' Row," these buildings still stand.

The early nineteenth century revived interest in classical education for the small town. Many institutions of higher learning, mostly all-women's colleges, were established, including the Ewing Institute, the Elmwood Academy, and Harmonia College. One of Harmonia College's graduates achieved national prominence  Carrie Nation, the national temperance leader, boarded at the Karrick-Parks house while living in Perryville. As Nation "cleaned out" a number of local spots, it is believed that Perryville became the first location in the United States to exercise Local Option laws.

In October 1862, the fields west of town were the site of the Battle of Perryville, an important encounter in the American Civil War that ended the Kentucky Campaign of Confederate generals Braxton Bragg and Edmund Kirby Smith. The Perryville Battlefield is preserved as a state park, and is the site of a reenactment of the battle every year.

In 1961, Perryville and the surrounding area was made part of a National Historic Landmark area. In 1973, the entire town of Perryville, because of the contribution the village has made toward American history, was put on the National Register of Historic Places.

Geography
Perryville is located at  (37.649974, -84.950176) at the junction of US Route 68 and US Route 150.

Demographics

As of the census of 2000, there were 763 people, 348 households, and 220 families residing in the city. The racial makeup of the city was 93.18% White, 4.98% African American, 0.13% Native American, 0.13% Asian, and 1.57% from two or more races.

There were 348 households, out of which 27.6% had children under the age of 18 living with them, 44.8% were married couples living together, 15.5% had a female householder with no husband present, and 36.5% were non-families. 35.9% of all households were made up of individuals, and 21.3% had someone living alone who was 65 years of age or older. The average household size was 2.19 and the average family size was 2.81.

In the city, the population was spread out, with 24.1% under the age of 18, 5.8% from 18 to 24, 26.9% from 25 to 44, 22.0% from 45 to 64, and 21.2% who were 65 years of age or older. The median age was 39 years. For every 100 females, there were 79.5 males. For every 100 females age 18 and over, there were 74.4 males.

The median income for a household in the city was $28,594, and the median income for a family was $36,042. Males had a median income of $30,250 versus $25,938 for females. The per capita income for the city was $16,202. About 11.7% of families and 15.5% of the population were below the poverty line, including 19.3% of those under age 18 and 13.4% of those age 65 or over

Notable people 
 E. Belle Mitchell (18481942), first African-American educator at Camp Nelson, and co-founder of the Colored Orphans Industrial Home in Lexington, Kentucky
 Jesse Valencia (19812004), murder victim

References

External links

 Historic Perryville KY, community page
 Battle of Perryville Reenactment
 Danville-Boyle County Convention & Visitors Bureau

Cities in Boyle County, Kentucky
Cities in Kentucky
Danville, Kentucky micropolitan area
1817 establishments in Kentucky